The North American Nietzsche Society  (NANS) is a philosophical society founded in 1979 whose purpose is to promote the study of the philosophy of Friedrich Nietzsche in North America.

See also
North American Kant Society

References

External links 

Friedrich Nietzsche
Philosophical societies in the United States
Organizations based in North America
Organizations established in 1979
Continental philosophy organizations
American philosophy
1979 establishments in the United States